The Choice Four were the most consistent of the male American soul/vocal groups produced by Van McCoy. They were from Washington, D.C., recorded for RCA Records and had three albums. Several of the group's members had previously sung in The Love Tones and The Stridels. They had several minor hits on the Billboard charts in the mid-1970s. Their attempt to hit big with their version of "When You're Young And In Love" was thwarted by the simultaneous release of a disco version of the song by actor Ralph Carter (of the "Good Times" TV show). Their biggest hit, '"Come Down To Earth" became a favorite in the discos after the group had broken up. They recorded the original version of the David Ruffin hit "Walk Away From Love" (also produced by McCoy), hitting the high note that Ruffin famously missed. Both Pede "Pete" Marshall and Charles Blagmon went on to tour with groups led by former members of The Temptations after the group's demise, prior to its revival by Teddy Maduro.

Maduro announced his bandmate Pede Marshall had died on July 13, 2017.

Members
Bobby Hamilton 
Ted Maduro
Pede "Pete" Marshall
Charles Blagmon (a/k/a "Blackmon")

Albums
The Finger Pointers (RCA, 1974)
The Choice Four (RCA, 1975)
On Top of Clear (RCA, 1976) US R&B #43

Singles

References

Musical groups from Washington, D.C.
American disco groups